B-K Root Beer is an independent chain of drive-in fast-food restaurants, distinguished by their draft root beer and root beer floats. A midwestern chain, B-K restaurants are located in Indiana, Michigan, and Ohio.  B-K stands for "Bergerson & Kenefick".  The first one was built in Wabash, Indiana, in 1940.

At one time, there were 238 B-K drive-ins around Indiana and surrounding states.  It was founded by Melvin and Mary Bergerson in the mid-1940s in Michigan City, Indiana.

History
The first B-K chain was founded in the mid-1940s in Wabash, Indiana. All of the current B-K Rootbeer restaurants are independently owned and operated.

The B-K Root Beer chain of drive-in restaurants became owned by DeNovo Corporation in Livonia, Michigan, of which David Chapoton was President. In the late 1980s, Dave sold the B-K trademarks to Burger King Corporation, which they then launched their new Grilled Chicken sandwich, the BK Broiler. 

In 2016, the B-K trademarks were abandoned by Burger king, and David Hosticka of Michigan retained the trademark & patent attorney Jake W. Lombardo of Bolhouse, Baar & Hofstee, P.C. and attempted to re-register the B-K Root Beer trademarks for the purpose of supporting the 35 or so remaining drive-in locations, and possibly reviving the B-K Root Beer brand. The application was rejected by the US Patent and Trademark office, citing that the letters B-K are still currently registered by Burger King Corporation.

See also
 List of hamburger restaurants

References 

Restaurants in Indiana
Restaurants in Iowa
Restaurants in Ohio
Economy of the Midwestern United States
Regional restaurant chains in the United States
Fast-food chains of the United States
Fast-food hamburger restaurants
Fast-food franchises
Drive-in restaurants
Root beer stands
Hot dog restaurants in the United States
Root beer
1940s establishments in Indiana